Carabus blaptoides oxuroides is a subspecies of ground beetle in the family Carabidae that is endemic to Japan. The species are gray  coloured with purple pronotum.

References

blaptoides oxuroides
Beetles described in 1862
Endemic fauna of Japan
Taxa named by Hermann Rudolph Schaum